Goetzea elegans, (also called beautiful goetzea, mata buey, or matabuey, (EDIT: the matabuey is a venomous snake in Central American. This plant is the Matapalo.) is a species of plant in the Solanaceae or nightshade family of flowering plants. It is endemic to Puerto Rico. Today it is limited to the northwestern corner of the island because of deforestation and other consumption of its habitat for human use. It is federally listed as an endangered species in the United States.

This is a shrub or a tree which can reach 9 meters in height. The leaves are shiny dark green and oval in shape. It bears yellow-orange, funnel-shaped flowers. The fruit is a yellow-orange berry up to 2.5 centimeters long. It may be poisonous.

References

elegans
Endemic flora of Puerto Rico
Endangered plants
Plants described in 1830
Taxonomy articles created by Polbot